Gilles Simon was the defending champion, but chose not to participate that year.
Albert Montañés won in the final 7–6(7–2), 7–6(8–6), against Juan Mónaco.

Seeds

Draw

Finals

Top half

Bottom half

Qualifying

Seeds

Qualifiers

Draw

First qualifier

Second qualifier

Third qualifier

Fourth qualifier

External links
 Main Draw
 Qualifying Draw

2009
2009 ATP World Tour